{{DISPLAYTITLE:C5H10N2O2S}}
The molecular formula C5H10N2O2S (molar mass: 162.21 g/mol, exact mass: 162.0463 u) may refer to:

 Acetylcysteinamide, or N-Acetylcysteine amide
 Methomyl